Mount Christie may refer to:

 Mount Christie (Alberta) in Alberta, Canada
 Mount Christie (Michigan) in Michigan, USA 
 Mount Christie (Washington) in Washington, USA